This is a list of the municipalities in the state of Pará (PA), located in the North Region of Brazil. Pará is divided into 144 municipalities, which are grouped into 22 microregions, which are grouped into 6 mesoregions.

See also
Geography of Brazil
List of cities in Brazil

References

Para